The following is a hierarchical outline for the French French Army at the end of the Cold War. It is intended to convey the connections and relationships between units and formations. The theoretical combat strength of the army was 295,989 soldiers, of the 557,904 individuals available for service across the entire French Armed Forces in 1989.

In 1967 with the withdrawal of French forces from the NATO Military Command Structure, agreements were reached between the SACEUR at the time, General Lyman Lemnitzer, and the French Chief of Staff, General Charles Ailleret (:fr:Charles Ailleret), under which the French forces in Germany might in certain circumstances fight alongside Allied Forces Central Europe.

In 1977 the Army had changed its military organisation in accordance with a short war-fighting strategy in Europe, and divisions lost their component brigades. Under army headquarters in 1985 were the First Army, with three corps, the Rapid Action Force, an independent corps-level rapid deployment command, six military regions in the metropole (including the former Défense opérationnelle du territoire territorial defence forces), and forces overseas, including DOM-TOM, in Guyana, Senegal, Côte d'Ivoire, Gabon, Djibouti, Seychelles/Mayotte, New Caledonia, and French Polynesia.

Regimental structure 
Below follows a description of the organisation of the various regiments of the French Army.

Armored divisions 

 The Command and Support Regiments field one signal company, two transport companies, one maintenance company, one medical company and the divisional HQ company.
 Armored regiments field either three or four tank companies with 17 tanks each and plus 2 tanks in the regimental HQ Company (53 tanks in one regiment).
 Mechanized regiments field three mechanized infantry companies equipped with AMX-10P, a tank company with 17 tanks and the regimental HQ Company.
 Infantry regiments field three infantry companies equipped with VAB and the regimental HQ Company.
 Self-propelled artillery regiments field four artillery batteries with six AMX-30 AuF1 each and the regimental HQ battery.
 Engineer regiments field three combat engineer companies, one civil affairs company and the regimental HQ Company.

Light armored divisions 
The four light armored divisions (6e Division Légère Blindée, 9e Division d'Infanterie de Marine, 12e Division Légère Blindée and 14e Division Légère Blindée) vary in their structure.

 The Command and Support Regiments field one signal company, two transport companies, one maintenance company, one medical company and the divisional HQ company, with the exception of the 12th and 14 Division which field only one transport company.
 Reconnaissance regiments field three reconnaissance companies with 12 AMX-10RC or 12 ERC-90 each, one anti-tank company with 12 VAB/HOT) and the regimental HQ Company.
 Armored regiments field three tank companies with 17 tanks each and the regimental HQ Company.
 Infantry regiments field four infantry companies equipped with VAB and the regimental HQ Company. 
 Artillery regiments field three artillery batteries with six M50 each and the regimental HQ battery. Additionally the 6th and 9th division artillery regiments also field one air defence artillery battery.
 Engineer regiments field three combat engineer companies and the regimental HQ Company.

Infantry divisions 
 The Command and Support Regiments field one signal company, two transport companies, one maintenance company, one medical company and the divisional HQ company.
 Reconnaissance regiments field three reconnaissance companies with 12 AMX-10RC each, one anti-tank company with 12 VAB/HOT) and the regimental HQ Company.
 Infantry regiments field three infantry companies equipped with VAB and the regimental HQ Company.
 Artillery regiments field four artillery batteries with six M50 each and the regimental HQ battery.
 Engineer regiments field three combat engineer companies and the regimental HQ Company.

General Staff of the Army 

 General Staff of the Army, (État-major de l’Armée de terre), Vincennes, France
 24e Régiment d'Infanterie (24e RI), Vincennes
 8e Régiment de Transmission (8e RT), Vincennes
 41e Régiment de Transmission (41e RT), Suresnes
 1er Régiment du Train (1er RT), Vincennes
 Escadrille d’hélicoptères légère de l'État-major de l’armée de terre, Les Mureaux
Forces Françaises à Berlin, Berlin
 11e Régiment de Chasseurs (11e RCh) (41x AMX-30B)
 46e Régiment d'Infanterie (46e RI) (63x VAB)
 110e Compagnie du Génie (110e CG)

First French Army 

 First French Army, (1re Armée), Strasbourg, France
 13e Régiment de Dragons Parachutistes (13e RDP), Dieuze (Long Range Reconnaissance/Special Forces)
 6e Régiment d'Artillerie (6e RA), Phalsbourg (16x RASIT)
 7e Régiment d'Artillerie (7e RA), Nevers (with CL-89 drones)
 401e Régiment d'Artillerie (401e RA), Draguignan, Air defence training (24x I-Hawk launchers, 8x Roland missile systems)
 402e Régiment d'Artillerie (402e RA), Châlons-sur-Marne (24x I-Hawk launchers)
 403e Régiment d'Artillerie (403e RA), Quartier Général d'Aboville, Chaumont (24x I-Hawk launchers)
 12e Régiment du Génie (Réserve) (12e RG), Neubourg
 16e Régiment du Génie (Réserve) (16e RG), Mulhouse
 40e Régiment de Transmission (40e RT), Thionville
 44e Régiment de Transmission (44e RT), Landau, FRG (Electronic Warfare)
 54e Régiment de Transmission (54e RT), Haguenau (Electronic Warfare)
 Groupe Géographique/28e Régiment d'Artillerie (28e RA), Joigny
 83e Bataillon des engins fluviaux du Génie, Kehl
 Escadrille d’hélicoptères légère de la 1re Armée, Baden-Baden

I French Corps 

I French Corps, 1er Corps d'armée (1er CA), Metz, France
 8e Régiment de Hussards (8e RH), Altkirch (36x AMX-10RC, 24x Milan (missile))
 1er Régiment du Génie (1er RG), Illkirch-Graffenstaden
 2e Régiment du Génie (2e RG), Metz
 7e Régiment d'Helicopteres de Combat (7e RHC), Essey-lès-Nancy, (16x Gazelle/HOT, 8x Alouette III, 8x SA330 Puma)
 18e Régiment de Transmission (18e RT), Épinal
 57e Régiment de Transmission (57e RT), Mulhouse
 602e Régiment de Circulation Routière (602e RCR), Dijon
 619e Régiment de Circulation Routière (Reserve) (619e RCR), Dôle
 11e Groupe d’Hélicoptères Légers (Réserve) (11e GHL), Essey-lès-Nancy
 39e Escadron d'Artillerie de Corps d'Armée (39e EACA), Metz
 Commandement de l'Artillerie du 1er Corps
 3e Régiment d'Artillerie (3e RA), Mailly (6x Pluton launchers)
 15e Régiment d'Artillerie (15e RA), Suippes (6x Pluton launchers)
 25e Régiment d'Artillerie (25e RA), (Réserve), Saint-Avold (24x M50)
 47e Régiment d'Artillerie (47e RA), (Réserve), Héricourt (24x M50)
 57e Régiment d'Artillerie (57e RA), Bitche (24x Roland missile systems mounted on AMX-30)
 601e Régiment NBC (Réserve), Metz
 Batterie d'Artillerie du 1er Corps d'Armée, (BACA 1) Metz
 Brigade Logistique du 1er Corps
 508e Régiment du Train (508e RT), Chaumont
 516e Régiment du Train (516e RT), Toul
 1er Régiment du Matériel (1er RMAT), Sarrebourg
 5e Régiment du Matériel (5e RMAT), Strasbourg
 8e Régiment du Matériel (8e RMAT), Verdun
 21e Bataillon du Matériel (21e BMAT), Mailly
 711e Compagnie mixte des Essences (711e CME), Langres (Fuel Supply Company) 
 766e Compagnie mixte des Essences (Réserve) (766e CME), Langres
 11e Compagnie Médicale, Sedan
 612e Compagnie de Ravitaillement (Réserve), Vitry-le-François (Medical Supply Company)
 613e Compagnie de Ravitaillement (Réserve), Vitry-le-François

1ère Division Blindée 
1ère Division Blindée (1ère DB), Trier, FRG
 1er Régiment de Commandement et de Soutien (1er RCS), Trier
 1er Régiment de Cuirassiers (1er RC), Sankt Wendel (70x AMX-30B2)
 6e Régiment de Dragons (6e RD), Saarburg, Germany (70x AMX-30B2)
 8e Groupe de Chasseurs (8e GC), Wittlich (16x AMX-30B, 51x AMX-10P)
 16e Groupe de Chasseurs (16e GC), Saarburg, Germany (16x AMX-30B, 51x AMX-10P)
 153e  Régiment d'Infanterie (153e RI), Mutzig (70x VAB)
 9e Régiment d'Artillerie de Marine (9e RAMa), Trier (20x AMX-30 AuF1)
 61e Régiment d'Artillerie (61e RA), Morhange (20x AMX-30 AuF1)
 13e Régiment du Génie (13e RG), Trier
 1er Escadron d'Éclairage Divisionnaire (1er EED), Sankt Wendel
 1re Compagnie Antichar (1re CAC), Mutzig (12x VAB/HOT)

7e Division Blindée 
7e Division Blindée, (7e DB), Besançon
 7e Régiment de Commandement et de Soutien (7e RCS), Besançon
 1er Régiment de Dragons (1er RD), Lure (53x AMX-30B2, 11x AMX-10P)
 3e Régiment de Cuirassiers (3e RC), Chenevières (53x AMX-30B2, 11x AMX-10P)
 5e Régiment de Dragons (5e RD), Valdahon (53x AMX-30B2, 11x AMX-10P)
 30e Groupe de Chasseurs (30e GC), Lunéville (17x AMX-30B2, 39x AMX-10P)
 35e Régiment d'Infanterie (35e RI), Belfort (17x AMX-30B2, 39x AMX-10P)
 170e Régiment d'Infanterie (170e RI), Épinal (70x VAB)
 1er Régiment d'Artillerie (1er RA), Montbéliard (24x AMX-30 AuF1)
 60e Régiment d'Artillerie (60e RA), Canjuers (24x AMX-30 AuF1)
 19e Régiment du Génie (19e RG), Besançon
 7e Escadron d'Éclairage Divisionnaire (7e EED), Valdahon
 7e Compagnie Antichar (7e CAC), Lunéville (12x VAB/HOT)

12e Division Légère Blindée Ecole 
12e Division Légère Blindée Ecole, (12e DLBE), Cavalry School, Saumur, training brigade stationed in the West of France
 12e Régiment de Commandement et de Soutien (12e RCS), Tours
 507e Régiment Chars de Combat (507e RCC), Fontevraud (53x AMX-30B2)
 3e Régiment de Chasseurs (3e RCh), Fontevraud  (36x ERC-90, 12x VAB/HOT)
 3e Régiment de Chasseurs Parachutistes (3e RCP), Pau (Light Infantry)
 114e Régiment d'Infanterie (114e RI), Saint-Maixent-l'École (17x AMX-30B2, 39x AMX-10P)
 33e Régiment d'Artillerie (Réserve) (33e RA), Poitiers (24x M50)
 14e Régiment du Génie (Réserve) (14e RG), Angers

14e Division Légère Blindée Ecole 
14e Division Légère Blindée Ecole, (14e DLBE), Montpellier, training brigade stationed in the South of France
 81e Régiment d'Infanterie (81e RI), Montpellier (acts as Régiment de Commandement et de Soutien for the division)
 11e Régiment Cuirassiers (11e RC), Aubagne (53x AMX-30B2)
 1er Régiment de Chasseurs (1er RCh), Canjuers (36x AMX-10RC, 12x VAB/HOT)
 4e Régiment Étranger d'Infanterie (4e REI), Castelnaudary (Light Infantry)
 3e Régiment d'Infanterie (3e RI), Nîmes (17x AMX-30B2, 39x AMX-10P)
 13e Régiment d'Artillerie (Réserve) (13e RA), Draguignan (24x M50)
 4e Régiment du Génie (4e RG), La Valbonne

II French Corps 
II French Corps, 2e Corps d'armée (2e CA), Baden-Baden, FRG
 3e Régiment de Hussards (3e RH), Pforzheim (36x AMX-10RC, 12x VAB/HOT)
 10e Régiment du Génie (10e RG), Spire
 11e Régiment du Génie (11e RG), Rastatt
 2e Régiment d'Helicopteres de Combat (2e RHC), Friedrichshafen (30x Gazelle/HOT, 19x Alouette III, 11x Cougar)
 42e Régiment de Transmission (42e RT), Rastatt
 53e Régiment de Transmission (53e RT), Freiburg
 601e Régiment de Circulation Routière (601e RCR), Achern
 680e Régiment de Circulation Routière (Réserve), (680e RCR), Achern
 12e Groupe d’Hélicoptères Légers (12e GHL), Föhren
 Commandement de l'Artillerie du 2e Corps
 12e Régiment d'Artillerie (12e RA), Oberhoffen (24x M270 MLRS)
 32e Régiment d'Artillerie (32e RA), Oberhoffen (6x Pluton launchers)
 43e Régiment d'Artillerie de Marine (43e RAMa) (Réserve), Valbonne (24x M50)
 74e Régiment d'Artillerie (74e RA), Belfort (6x Pluton launchers)
 75e Régiment d'Artillerie (75e RA) (Réserve), Varces (24x towed M101)
 51e Régiment d'Artillerie (51e RA), Wittlich (24x Roland missile systems mounted on AMX-30)
 53e Régiment d'Artillerie (53e RA), Breisach (24x Roland missile systems mounted on AMX-30)
 602e Régiment NBC (Réserve) Oberhoffen
 64e Batterie de Corps d'Armée (64e BACA), Offenburg
 Brigade Logistique du 2e Corps
 135e Régiment du Train (135e RT), Karlsruhe
 521e Régiment du Train (521e RT), Karlsruhe
 2e Régiment du Matériel (2e RMAT), Freiburg
 6e Régiment du Matériel (6e RMAT), Rastatt
 7e Régiment du Matériel (7e RMAT), Trier
 22e Bataillon du Matériel (22e BMAT), Oberhoffen
 702e Compagnie mixte des Essences (702e CME), Renchen (Fuel Supply Company)
 777e Compagnie mixte des Essences (Réserve) (777e CME), Renchen
 21e Compagnie Médicale, Neustadt
 610e Compagnie de Ravitaillement (Réserve), Bühl (Medical Supply Company)
 611e Compagnie de Ravitaillement (Réserve), Bühl

3e Division Blindée 
3e Division Blindée, (3e DB), Freiburg, FRG
 3e Régiment de Commandement et de Soutien (3e RCS), Freiburg
 3e Régiment de Dragons (3e RD), Stetten (70x AMX-30B2, 11x AMX-10P)
 12e Régiment de Cuirassiers (12e RC), Müllheim (70x AMX-30B2, 11x AMX-10P)
 19e Groupe de Chasseurs (19er GC), Villingen (17x AMX-30B2, 39x AMX-10P)
 42e Régiment d'Infanterie (42e RI), Offenburg (17x AMX-30B2, 39x AMX-10P)
 110e Régiment d'Infanterie (110e RI), Donaueschingen (70x VAB)
 11e Régiment d'Artillerie (11er RA), Offenburg (24x AMX-30 AuF1)
 34e Régiment d'Artillerie (34e RA), Müllheim (24x AMX-30 AuF1)
 9e Régiment du Génie (9e RG), Neuf-Brisach
 3e Escadron d'Éclairage Divisionnaire (3e EED), Stetten
 3e Compagnie Antichar (3e CAC), Donaueschingen (12x VAB/HOT)

5e Division Blindée 
5e Division Blindée, (5e DB), Landau
 5e Régiment de Commandement et de Soutien (5e RCS), Landau
 2e Régiment de Cuirassiers (2e RC), Reutlingen (53x AMX-30B2, 11x AMX-10P)
 4e Régiment de Cuirassiers (4e RC), Bitche (53x AMX-30B2, 11x AMX-10P)
 5e Régiment de Cuirassiers (5e RC), Kaiserslautern (53x AMX-30B2, 11x AMX-10P)
 2e Groupe de Chasseurs (2e GC), Neustadt (17x AMX-30B2, 39x AMX-10P)
 24e Groupe de Chasseurs (24e GC), Tübingen (17x AMX-30B2, 39x AMX-10P)
 152e Régiment d'Infanterie (152e RI), Colmar (70x VAB)
 2e Régiment d'Artillerie (2e RA), Landau (24x AMX-30 AuF1 155mm)
 24e Régiment d'Artillerie (24e RA), Reutlingen (24x AMX-30 AuF1 155mm)
 32e Régiment du Génie (32e RG), Kehl
 5e Escadron d'Éclairage Divisionnaire (5e EED), Landau
 5e Compagnie Antichar (5e CAC), Colmar (12x VAB/HOT)

15e Division d'Infanterie 
 15e Division d'Infanterie, (15e DI), Limoges, France
 15e Régiment de Commande-ment et de Soutien (15e RCS), Limoges
 5e Régiment de Chasseurs (5e RCh), Périgueux (36x AMX-10RC, 12x VAB/HOT)
 92e Régiment d'Infanterie (92e RI), Clermont-Ferrand (70x VAB)
 99e Régiment d'Infanterie (99e RI), Lyon (70x VAB)
 126e Régiment d'Infanterie (126e RI), Brive-la-Gaillarde (70x VAB)
 20e Régiment d'Artillerie (20e RA), Poitiers (24x M50)
 33e Régiment du Génie (Réserve) (33e RG), Castelsarrasin

III French Corps 

III French Corps, 3e Corps d'armée (3e CA), Lille, France
 2e Régiment de Hussards (2e RH), Sourdun (36x AMX-10RC, 12x VAB/HOT)
 6e Régiment du Génie (6e RG), Angers
 71e Régiment du Génie (71e RG), Oissel
 6e Régiment d'Helicoptères de Combat (6e RHC), Margny-lès-Compiègne (16x Gazelle/HOT, 10x Gazelle/20mm, 8x Puma)
 51e Régiment de Transmission (51e RT), Compiègne
 58e Régiment de Transmission (58e RT), Laon
 604e Régiment de Circulation Routière (Réserve), (604e RCR), Tours
 625e Régiment de Circulation Routière, (625e RCR), Arras
 13e Groupe d’Hélicoptères Légers (Réserve), (13e GHL), Lesquin
 43e Régiment d'Infanterie et de Commandement de Corps d'armée, (43e RICCA), Lille
 Commandement de l'Artillerie du 3e Corps
 4e Régiment d'Artillerie (4e RA), Couvron (6x Pluton launchers)
 2e Régiment d'Artillerie de Marine (2e RAMa) (Reserve), Montlhéry (24x M50)
 19e Régiment d'Artillerie (19e RA) (Training), Draguignan (6x Pluton launchers)
 22e Régiment d'Artillerie de Marine (22e RAMa) (Réserve), Folembray (24x M50)
 54e Régiment d'Artillerie (54e RA), Hyères (24x Roland missile systems mounted on AMX-30)
 58e Régiment d'Artillerie (58e RA), Douai (32x Roland missile systems mounted on AMX-30)
 603e Régiment NBC, (603e RNBC) (Training), Bretteville-sur-Odon
 Batterie d'artillerie du 3e Corps d'Armée (BACA 3), Lille
 Brigade Logistique du 3e Corps
 517e Régiment du Train, (517e RT), Vernon
 522e Régiment du Train (Réserve), (522e RT), Auneau
 3e Régiment du Matériel, (3e RMAT), Beauvais
 4e Régiment du Matériel, (4e RMAT), Fontainebleau
 705e Compagnie mixte des Essences, (705e CME), Évreux (Fuel Supply Company)
 707e Compagnie mixte des Essences (Réserve), (707e CME), Évreux
 31e Compagnie Médicale, Sedan
 614e Compagnie de Ravitaillement (Réserve), Chartres (Medical Supply Company)
 615e Compagnie de Ravitaillement (Réserve), Chartres

2e Division Blindée 
2e Division Blindée, (2e DB), Versailles, France
 2e Régiment de Commandement et de Soutien (2e RCS), Satory
 2e Régiment de Dragons (2e RD), Laon-Couvron Air Base (53x AMX-30B2)
 6e Régiment de Cuirassiers (6e RC), Olivet (53x AMX-30B2,)
 501e Régiment Chars de Combat (501e RCC), Rambouillet (53x AMX-30B2)
 Régiment de Marché de Tchad (RMT), Montlhéry (16x AMX-30B2, 51x AMX-10P)
 5e Régiment d'Infanterie (5e RI), Beynes (16x AMX-30B2, 51x AMX-10P)
 39e Régiment d'Infanterie (39e RI), Rouen (63x VAB)
 1er Régiment d'Artillerie de Marine (1er RAMa), Montlhéry (20x AMX-30 AuF1)
 40e Régiment d'Artillerie (40e RA), Suippes (20x AMX-30 AuF1)
 34e Régiment du Génie (34e RG), Épernay
 2e Escadron d'Éclairage Divisionnaire (2e EED), Saint-Germain-en-Laye
 2e Compagnie Antichar (10e CAC), Rouen (12x VAB/HOT)

8e Division d'Infanterie 
8e Division d'Infanterie, (8e DI), Amiens, France
 8e Régiment de Commande-ment et de Soutien (8e RCS), Amiens
 7e Régiment de Chasseurs (7e RCh), Arras (36x AMX-10RC, 24x [Milan (missile)])
 8e Régiment d'Infanterie (8e RI), Noyon (84x VAB)
 67e Régiment d'Infanterie (67e RI), Soissons (84x VAB)
 94e Régiment d'Infanterie (94e RI), Sissonne (84x VAB)
 41e Régiment d'Artillerie de Marine (41e RAMa), La Fère (24x M50)
 23e Régiment du Génie (Réserve) (23e RG), Oissel

10e Division Blindée 
 10e Division Blindée, (10e DB), Châlons-sur-Marne, France
 10e Régiment de Commandement et de Soutien (10e RCS), Châlons-sur-Marne
 2e Régiment de Chasseurs (2e RCh), Thierville-sur-Meuse (53x AMX-30B2, 11x AMX-10P)
 4e Régiment de Dragons (4e RD), Mourmelon (53x AMX-30B2, 11x AMX-10P)
 503e Régiment Chars de Combat (503e RCC), Mourmelon (53x AMX-30B2, 11x AMX-10P)
 1er Groupe de Chasseurs (1er GC), Reims (17x AMX-30B2, 39x AMX-10P)
 150e Régiment d'Infanterie (150e RI), Verdun (17x AMX-30B2, 39x AMX-10P)
 151e Régiment d'Infanterie (151e RI), Metz (70x VAB)
 3e Régiment d'Artillerie de Marine (3e RAMa), Verdun (24x AMX-30 AuF1)
 8e Régiment d'Artillerie (8e RA), Commercy (24x AMX-30 AuF1)
 3e Régiment du Génie (3e RG), Charleville-Mézières
 10e Escadron d'Éclairage Divisionnaire (10e EED), Mourmelon
 10e Compagnie Antichar (10e CAC), Metz (12x VAB/HOT)

Rapid Action Force 

 Rapid Action Force, Saint-Germain-en-Laye, a corps level command of the French Army, whose primary mission was to support NATO's Northern Army Group in case of war. All five divisions, already understrength at their conception, were reduced to brigades during the 1990s.
 17e Régiment de Commandement et de Soutien (17e RCS), Maisons-Laffitte
 28e Régiment de Transmission, (28e RT), Orléans
 511e Régiment du Train, (511e RT), Vernon
 615e Régiment de Circulation Routière, (615e RCR), Pannes
 622e Régiment de Circulation Routière (Réserve), (622e RCR), Dôle
 703e Compagnie mixte des Essences, (703e CME), Chalon-sur-Saône
 708e Compagnie mixte des Essences (Réserve), (708e CME), Chalon-sur-Saône

4e Division Aéromobile 

4e Division Aéromobile, (4e DAM), Nancy
 4e Régiment d'Hélicoptères de Commandement et de Manœuvre (4e RHCM), Nancy (10x Gazelle 341F, 30x Puma)
 1er Régiment d'Infanterie (1er RI), Sarrebourg
 1er Régiment d'Helicopteres de Combat (1e RHC), Phalsbourg (10x Sa-341, 30x Gazelle/HOT, 10x Gazelle/20mm, 10x Puma)
 3e Régiment d'Helicopteres de Combat (3e RHC), Étain (10x Sa-341, 30x Gazelle/HOT, 10x Gazelle/20mm, 10x Puma)
 5e Régiment d'Helicopteres de Combat (5e RHC), Pau (10x Sa-341, 30x Gazelle/HOT, 10x Gazelle/20mm, 10x Puma)
 9e Régiment de Soutien Aéromobile (9e RSAM), Phalsbourg:

Wartime: The 4th RHCM consists of a squadron commander and liaison with ten light helicopters type SA341F Gazelle, and five utility helicopters squadrons each with ten type SA330Ba Puma transport helicopters. The 1st, 3rd and 5th RHC are composed of a squadron of light reconnaissance helicopter with nine light helicopters type SA341F Gazelle. These devices called "smooth" knowing that they do not carry on-board armament, used for reconnaissance or command support, a support helicopter squadron protection with ten light helicopters type SA341F2 Gazelle. These aircraft, each provided with a 20 mm gun used in support of ground troops and protection of other aircraft, anti-tank squadrons of three helicopters, each with ten light helicopters type SA342M Gazelle. These aircraft have four HOT antitank missiles for destroying armored vehicles of all kinds and a helicopter squadron maneuver with ten type SA330Ba Puma transport helicopters. None of these units possess Alouette III that is found only in peacetime in the 6th and 7th RHC each with ten machines.

6e Division Légère Blindée 

6e Division Légère Blindée, (6e DLB), Nîmes
 6e Régiment de Commandement et de Soutien (6e RCS), Nîmes
 1er Régiment de Spahis (1er RS), Valence (36x AMX-10RC, 12x VAB/HOT)
 1er Régiment Étranger de Cavalerie (1er REC), Orange (36x AMX-10RC, 12x VAB/HOT)
 2e Régiment Étranger d'Infanterie (2e REI), Nîmes (70x VAB)
 21e Régiment d'Infanterie de Marine (21e RIMa), Fréjus (70x VAB)
 68e Régiment d'Artillerie (68e RA), Valbonne (24x M50)
 6e Régiment Étranger de Génie (6e REG), L’Ardoise

9e Division d'Infanterie de Marine 
9e Division d'Infanterie de Marine, (9e DIMa), Nantes, trained for amphibious operations
 9e Régiment de Commandement et de Soutien (9e RCS), Nantes
 Régiment d'Infanterie-Chars de Marine (RICM), Vannes (36x ERC-90, 12x VAB/HOT)
 1er Régiment d'Infanterie de Marine (1er RIMa), Angoulême (36x ERC 90, 12x VAB/HOT)
 2e Régiment d'Infanterie de Marine (2e RIMa), Champagné (70x VAB)
 3e Régiment d'Infanterie de Marine (3e RIMa), Vannes (70x VAB)
 11e Régiment d'Artillerie de Marine (11e RAMa), Saint-Aubin-du-Cormier (24x towed M101)
 14e Regiment du Génie (Reserve) (14e RG), Angers

11e Division Parachutiste 

11e Division Parachutiste, (11e DP), Toulouse
 7e Régiment de Commandement et de Soutien (7e RPCS), Albi
 14e Régiment de Commandement et de Soutien (14e RPCS), Toulouse
 1er Régiment de Hussards Parachutistes (1er RHP), Tarbes (36x AML 90)
 1er Régiment de Chasseurs Parachutistes (1er RCP), Saint-Médard-en-Jalles
 1er Régiment de Parachutistes d'Infanterie de Marine (1er RPIMa), Bayonne
 2e Régiment Étranger de Parachutistes (2e REP), Calvi
 3e Régiment Parachutiste d'Infanterie de Marine (3e RPIMa), Carcassonne
 6e Régiment Parachutiste d'Infanterie de Marine (6e RPIMa), Mont-de-Marsan
 8e Régiment Parachutiste d'Infanterie de Marine (8e RPIMa), Castres
 9e Régiment de Chasseurs Parachutistes (9e RCP), Pamiers
 35e Régiment d'Artillerie Parachutiste (35e RAP), Tarbes (24x towed M101)
 17e Régiment du Génie Parachutiste (6e RGP), Montauban

27e Division Alpine 
27e Division Alpine, (27e DA), Grenoble
 27e Régiment de Commandement et de Soutien (27e RCS), Grenoble
 :fr:4e régiment de chasseurs (4e RCh), Gap (36x Panhard ERC-90)
 6e Bataillon de Chasseurs Alpins (6e BCA), Varces-Allières-et-Risset
 7e Bataillon de Chasseurs Alpins (7e BCA), Bourg-Saint-Maurice
 11e Bataillon de Chasseurs Alpins (11e BCA), Barcelonnette
 13e Bataillon de Chasseurs Alpins (13e BCA), Chambéry
 27e Bataillon de Chasseurs Alpins (27e BCA), Annecy
 159e Régiment d'Infanterie Alpine (159e RIA), Briançon
 93e Régiment d'Artillerie de Montagne (93e RAM), Varces (24x towed M101)
 7e Bataillon du Génie de division Alpine (7e BGDA), Avignon puis 7e Régiment du Génie

1st Logistic Command 
The 1st Logistic Command provided overseas logistic capabilities.
 1st Logistic Command, Montigny-lès-Metz
 1er Régiment de Livraison par Air (1er RLA), Montigny-les-Metz
 121e Régiment du Train, (121e RT), Linas
 503e Régiment du Train, (503e RT), La Rochelle
 505e Régiment du Train, (505e RT), Vienne
 515e Régiment du Train (515e RT), Brie
 519e Régiment du Train (519e RT), La Rochelle
 525e Régiment du Train (525e RT), Arras
 585e Régiment du Train (Réserve) (585e RT), Moulins
 500e Groupe de Transbordement Portuaire (Réserve), La Rochelle
 504e Groupe de Transbordement Portuaire (Réserve), La Rochelle
 506e Groupe de Transbordement Portuaire (Réserve), La Rochelle
 509e Groupe de Transbordement Portuaire (Réserve), La Rochelle
 514e Groupe de Transbordement Portuaire (Réserve), La Rochelle

Graphic of the French Army in Europe

Overseas Units

Africa 
Army forces in West Africa:
 Forces armées prépositionnées en Afrique
 6the Marine Infantry Battalion (6e BIMa), Libreville (Gabon)
 23e Bataillon d’Infanterie de Marine (23e BIMA), Dakar (Senegal)
 43e Bataillon d’Infanterie de Marine (43e BIMA), Abidjan (Ivory Coast)

Djibouti 

Army forces in Djibouti:
 Forces armées stationnées à Djibouti, Djibouti
 10e Bataillon de Commandement et de Soutien (10e BCS), Djibouti
 5e Régiment interarmes d'outre-mer, Djibouti
 13e Demi-brigade de la Légion Étrangère, Djibouti

Antilles & Guiana 
Army forces in the Lesser Antilles and French Guiana:
 Forces armées du groupe Antilles-Guyane, Fort-de-France (Martinique)
 16e Bataillon de Commandement et de Soutien (16e BCS), Fort-de-France (Martinique)
 3e Régiment Étranger d'Infanterie (3e REI), Kourou (Guiana)
 33e Régiment d’Infanterie de Marine (33e RIMA), Fort-de-France (Martinique)
 9e Bataillon d’Infanterie de Marine (9e BIMA), Cayenne (Guiana)
 41e Bataillon d’Infanterie de Marine (41e BIMA), Baie-Mahault (Guadeloupe)
 1er Régiment du service militaire adapté,	Fort-de-France (Martinique)
 2e Régiment du service militaire adapté, Pointe-à-Pitre (Guadeloupe)
 3e Régiment du service militaire adapté, Cayenne (Guiana)
 Groupement du service militaire adapté Saint-Jean-du-Maroni (Guiana)

Indian Ocean 
Army forces in the Southern Indian Ocean:
 Forces armées de la zone sud de l'Océan Indien, Saint-Denis (Réunion)
 53e Bataillon de Commandement et de Soutien (53e BCS), Saint-Denis (Réunion)
 2e Régiment Parachutiste d'Infanterie de Marine (2e RPIMa), Saint-Denis (Réunion)
 Détachement de la Légion Étrangère à Mayotte, Dzaoudzi (Mayotte)
 4e Régiment du service militaire adapté, Saint-Denis (Réunion)

French Polynesia 
Army forces in French Polynesia:
 Forces armées en Polynésie Française, Papeete (Tahiti)
 5e Régiment Étranger d'Infanterie (5e RE), Moruroa
 Régiment d'infanterie du Marine du Pacifique–Polynésie, Papeete
 815e Bataillon de Transmission (815e BT), Papeete

New Caledonia 
Army forces in New Caledonia:
 Forces armées de la Nouvelle-Calédonie, Nouméa
 42e Bataillon de Commandement et de Soutien (42e BCS), Nouméa
 Régiment d'Infanterie du Marine du Pacifique-Nouvelle-Calédonie, Nouméa 
 Groupement du service militaire adapté, Nouméa

Military regions and reserve forces 
In 1984, Isby and Kamps wrote that the Défense opérationnelle du territoire term remained in use despite the command having been disbanded in the 1970s.

1st Military Region 
 1ère Région militaire (1ère RM), Paris
 6e Régiment de Chasseurs (Réserve) (6e RCh), Rambouillet, (with AML-60 and AML-90)
 12e Régiment de Dragons (Réserve) (12e RD), Orléans, (with AML-60 and AML-90)
 54e Régiment d'Infanterie de Marine (Réserve) (54e RIMa), Pontoise
 95e Régiment d’Infanterie (Réserve) (95e RI), Bourges
 5e Régiment du Génie (Réserve) (5e RG), Versailles
 1er Régiment de Transmission de Zone de Défense (Réserve), (1er RTZD), Pontoise
 49e Régiment de Transmission, (49e RT), Pontoise
 101e Régiment du Train de Zone (Réserve) (101e RTZ), Linas
 505e Groupe Antiaérien Léger (Réserve) (505e GAL), Provins, (Bofors 40 mm gun)
 1er Groupe d’Hélicoptères Légers, Les Mureaux
 102e Brigade de Zone (Réserve) (102e BZ), Saint-Germain-en-Laye
 102e Régiment de Commandement et de Soutien (102e RCS), Versailles
 8e Régiment de Chasseurs (8e RCh), Olivet, (with AML-60 and AML-90)
 70e Régiment d'Infanterie de Marine (70e RIMa), Montlhéry
 91e Régiment d'Infanterie (91e RI), Beynes
 152e Compagnie du Génie (152e CG), Versailles
 162e Compagnie du Génie (162e CG), Versailles
 12e Circonscription Militaire de Défense
 76e Régiment d'Infanterie (Réserve) (76e RI), Vincennes
 13e Circonscription Militaire de Défense
 90e Régiment d'Infanterie (Réserve) (90e RI), Châteauroux

2nd Military Region 
 2e Région militaire (2e RM), Lille
 5e Régiment de Hussards (Réserve) (5e RH), Laon, (with AML-60 and AML-90)
 28e Régiment d’Infanterie (Réserve) (28e RI), Évreux
 33e Régiment d’Infanterie (Réserve) (33e RI), Saint-Omer
 73e Régiment d’Infanterie (Réserve) (73e RI), Aire-sur-la-Lys	
 84e Régiment d’Infanterie (Réserve) (84e RI), Cambrai	
 127e Régiment d’Infanterie (Réserve) (127e RI), Laon
 2e Régiment de Transmission de Zone de Défense (Réserve), (2e RTZD), Lille
 52e Régiment de Transmission, (52e RT), Lille
 102e Régiment du Train de Zone (Réserve)(102e RTZ), Arras
 Bataillon des canonniers sédentaires (Réserve) Lille, (Bofors 40 mm gun)
 2e Groupe d’Hélicoptères Légers, Dax
 108e Brigade de Zone (108e BZ), Amiens
 108e Régiment de Commandement et de Soutien (108e RCS), Amiens
 18e Régiment de Chasseurs (18e RCh), Arras, (with AML-60 and AML-90)
 45e Régiment d'Infanterie (45e RI), Soissons
 87e Régiment d'Infanterie (87e RI), Sissonne
 158e Compagnie du Génie (158e CG), Oissel
 168e Compagnie du Génie (168e CG), Oissel
 21e Circonscription Militaire de Défense
 243e Régiment d'Infanterie (Réserve) (243e RI), Lille
 22e Circonscription Militaire de Défense
 54e Régiment d'Infanterie (Réserve) (54e RI), Noyon
 23e Circonscription Militaire de Défense
 239e Régiment d'Infanterie (Réserve) (239e RI), Rouen

3rd Military Region 
 3e Région militaire (3e RM), Rennes
 41e Régiment d'Infanterie (41e RI), Châteaulin (70x VAB)
 19e Régiment d’Infanterie (Réserve) (19e RI), Brest
 77e Régiment d’Infanterie (Réserve) (77e RI), Fontevraud-l'Abbaye
 115e Régiment d’Infanterie (Réserve) (115e RI), Thorée-les-Pins
 118e Régiment d’Infanterie (Réserve) (118e RI), Châteaulin	
 125e Régiment d’Infanterie (Réserve) (125e RI), Poitiers
 21e Régiment du Génie (Réserve) (21e RG), Angers
 3e Régiment de Transmission de Zone de Défense (Réserve), (3e RTZD), Laval
 38e Régiment de Transmission, (38e RT), Laval
 103e Régiment du Train de Zone (Réserve)(103e RTZ), La Rochelle
 504e Groupe Antiaérien Léger (Réserve) (504e GAL), Tourouvre, (Bofors 40 mm gun)
 3e Groupe d’Hélicoptères Légers, Saint-Jacques-de-la-Lande
 109e Brigade de Zone (Réserve) (109e BZ), Saint-Malo
 109e Régiment de Commandement et de Soutien (109e RCS), Dinan
 19e Régiment de Dragons (19e RD), Vannes, (with AML-60 and AML-90)
 62e Régiment d'Infanterie (62e RI), Vannes
 117e Régiment d'Infanterie (117e RI), Le Mans
 159e Compagnie du Génie (159e CG), Angers
 169e Compagnie du Génie (169e CG), Angers
 31e Circonscription Militaire de Défense
 48e Régiment d'Infanterie (Réserve) (48e RI), Guingamp
 32e Circonscription Militaire de Défense
 2e Régiment d'Infanterie (Réserve) (2e RI), Caen
 33e Circonscription Militaire de Défense
 137e Régiment d'Infanterie (Réserve) (137e RI), Fontenay-le-Comte

4th Military Region 
 4e Région militaire (4e RM), Bordeaux
 49e Régiment d'Infanterie (Réserve) (49e RI), Bayonne
 50e Régiment d’Infanterie (Réserve) (50e RI), Périgueux
 63e Régiment d’Infanterie (Réserve) (63e RI), Limoges
 83e Régiment d’Infanterie (Réserve) (83e RI), Toulouse
 88e Régiment d’Infanterie (Réserve) (88e RI), Auch
 17e Régiment d'Artillerie (Training) (17e RA), Biscarrosse, (Bofors 40 mm gun)
 31e Régiment du Génie (Réserve) (31e RG), Castelsarrasin
 4e Régiment de Transmission de Zone de Défense (Réserve), (4e RTZD), Bordeaux
 48e Régiment de Transmission, (48e RT), Bordeaux
 104e Régiment du Train de Zone (Réserve)(104e RTZ), Brie
 4e Groupe d’Hélicoptères Légers, Martignas-sur-Jalle
 115e Brigade de Zone (Réserve) (115e BZ), Limoges
 115e Régiment de Commandement et de Soutien (115e RCS), Limoges
 9e Régiment de Chasseurs (9e RCh), Périgueux, (with AML-60 and AML-90)
 18e Régiment d'Infanterie (18e RI), Pau
 34e Régiment d'Infanterie (34e RI), Mont-de-Marsan
 165e Compagnie du Génie (165e CG), Castelsarrasin
 175e Compagnie du Génie (175e CG), Castelsarrasin
 41e Circonscription Militaire de Défense
 144e Régiment d'Infanterie (Réserve) (144e RI), Martignas-sur-Jalle
 42e Circonscription Militaire de Défense
 107e Régiment d'Infanterie (Réserve) (107e RI), Angoulême
 43e Circonscription Militaire de Défense
 100e Régiment d'Infanterie (Réserve) (100e RI), Brive-la-Gaillarde
 44e Circonscription Militaire de Défense
 15e Régiment d'Infanterie (Réserve) (15e RI), Castres

5th Military Region 
 5e Région militaire (5e RM), Lyon
 8e Régiment d'Infanterie de Marine (Réserve) (8e RIMa), Tarascon
 16e Régiment d’Infanterie (Réserve) (16e RI), Clermont-Ferrand
 38e Régiment d’Infanterie (Réserve) (38e RI), Saint-Étienne
 52e Régiment d’Infanterie (Réserve) (52e RI), Sathonay
 53e Régiment d’Infanterie (Réserve) (53e RI), Lunel
 112e Régiment d’Infanterie (Réserve) (112e RI), La Valette
 121e Régiment d’Infanterie (Réserve) (121e RI), Moulins
 15e Bataillon de Chasseurs Alpins (Réserve)(15e BCA), Barcelonnette
 22e Bataillon de Chasseurs Alpins (Réserve)(22e BCA), Briançon
 53e Bataillon de Chasseurs Alpins (Réserve)(53e BCA), Chambéry
 5e Régiment de Transmission de Zone de Défense (Réserve), (5e RTZD), Montélimar
 45e Régiment de Transmission, (45e RT), Montélimar
 105e Régiment du Train de Zone (Réserve)(105e RTZ), Vienne
 506e Groupe Antiaérien Léger (Réserve) (506e GAL), Hyères, (Bofors 40 mm gun)
 5e Groupe d’Hélicoptères Légers, Lyon
 24e Bataillon du Matériel, (24e BMAT), Saint-Priest
 127e Brigade de Zone (Réserve) (127e BZ), Grenoble
 127e Régiment de Commandement et de Soutien (127e RCS), Grenoble
 13e Régiment de Chasseurs (13e RCh), Gap, (with AML-60 and AML-90)
 67e Bataillon de Chasseurs Alpins (67e BCA)
 140e Régiment d'Infanterie Alpine (140e RIA), Varces
 177e Compagnie du Génie (177e CG), Avignon
 187e Compagnie du Génie (187e CG), Avignon
 51e Circonscription Militaire de Défense
 299e Régiment d'Infanterie (Réserve) (299e RI), Sathonay
 52e Circonscription Militaire de Défense
 292e Régiment d'Infanterie (Réserve) (292e RI), Clermont-Ferrand
 53e Circonscription Militaire de Défense
 141e Régiment d'Infanterie (Réserve) (141e RI), La Valette
 54e Circonscription Militaire de Défense
 142e Régiment d'Infanterie (Réserve) (142e RI), Béziers
 55e Circonscription Militaire de Défense
 173e Régiment d'Infanterie (Réserve) (173e RI), Bastia - disbanded July 2001 and contributed to formation of 6th Company, 2nd Foreign Parachute Regiment.
 373e Régiment d'Infanterie (Réserve) (373e RI), Ajaccio

6th Military Region 
 6e Région militaire (6e RM), Metz
 56e Régiment d’Infanterie (Réserve) (56e RI), Digoin
 69e Régiment d’Infanterie (Réserve) (69e RI), Pont-Sainte-Marie
 79e Régiment d’Infanterie (Réserve) (79e RI), Saint-Avold
 89e Régiment d’Infanterie (Réserve) (89e RI), Sens
 133e Régiment d’Infanterie (Réserve) (133e RI), Bourg-en-Bresse
 59e Régiment d'Artillerie (Réserve) (59e RA), Colmar, (Bofors 40 mm gun)
 6e Régiment de Transmission de Zone de Défense (Réserve), (6e RTZD), Montigny-lès-Metz
 43e Régiment de Transmission, (43e RT), Montigny-lès-Metz
 106e Régiment du Train de Zone (Réserve)(106e RTZ), Ecrouves
 6e Groupe d’Hélicoptères Légers, Dax
 107e Brigade de Zone (Réserve) (107e BZ), Besançon
 107e Régiment de Commandement et de Soutien (107e RCS), Besançon
 10e Régiment de Chasseurs (10e RCh), Lunéville, (with AML-60 and AML-90)
 23e Régiment d'Infanterie (23e RI), Les Rousses
 149e Régiment d'Infanterie (149e RI), Lunéville
 157e Compagnie du Génie (67e CG), Besançon
 167e Compagnie du Génie (167e CG), Besançon
 110e Brigade de Zone (Réserve) (110e BZ), Châlons-en-Champagne
 110e Régiment de Commandement et de Soutien (110e RCS), Chalons sur Marne
 15e Régiment de Chasseurs (15e RCh), Thierville-sur-Meuse, (with AML-60 and AML-90)
 41e Groupe de Chasseurs (41e GC), Reims
 164e Régiment d'Infanterie (164e RI), Verdun
 160e Compagnie du Génie (160e CG), Charleville-Mézières
 170e Compagnie du Génie (170e CG), Charleville-Mézières
 61e Circonscription Militaire de Défense
 26e Régiment d'Infanterie (Réserve) (26e RI), Pont-Saint-Vincent
 62e Circonscription Militaire de Défense
 37e Régiment d'Infanterie (Réserve) (37e RI), Sarrebourg
 63e Circonscription Militaire de Défense
 106e Régiment d'Infanterie (Réserve) (106e RI), Sedan
 64e Circonscription Militaire de Défense
 10e Régiment d'Infanterie (Réserve) (10e RI), Digoin
 65e Circonscription Militaire de Défense
 60e Régiment d'Infanterie (Réserve) (60e RI), Valdahon

Detached Units

French Air Force 
The Army provided two engineer regiments to the Armée de l'Air.
 15e Régiment du Génie de l'Air (15e RGA), Toul
 25e Régiment du Génie de l'Air (25e RGA), Compiègne

French Forces in Germany 
Tri-service Peacetime command for all French Forces in Germany.
 French Forces in Germany, Baden-Baden
 50e Régiment de Transmission (50e RT), Baden-Baden
 20e Régiment du Train (20e RT), Baden-Baden

Foreign Intelligence Service 
The Directorate-General for External Security (DGSE) is the foreign intelligence service of the French state. It acts in the interest of the government and not as a military intelligence, but it is subordinated to the Ministry of Defence as an independent military service. In 1989 the military intelligence function was carried out by the 2nd Department of the French General Staff (2e Bureau) and the Center for Exploitation of Military Intelligence Data (Centre d’exploitation du renseignement militaire). They were eventually merged in 1992 into the current Direction du renseignement militaire)
 Directorate-General for External Security, Paris
 44e Régiment d'Infanterie (44e RI), Cercottes - the 44e RI has a solely administrative function, acting as the parent unit of military personnel of the DGSE involved in intelligence data processing and analysis. In 1986 the previous 89e Bataillon de Services received this new designation.
11e Régiment Parachutiste de Choc (11e RPC), Cercottes - a covert intelligence gathering, sabotage and direct action parachute assault unit subordinated to the DGSE's Action Division. Formed in 1985 after the Rainbow Warrior case and the reorganisation of the DGSE's special operations forces. The 11th Parachute Assault Regiment re-formed through the amalgamation of the CINC at Aspretto Naval Air Base and the Specialised Parachute Training Center (Centre parachutiste d'entraînement spécialisé (CPES), previously designated Parachute Reservists Training Center - Centre d'entraînement des réservistes parachutistes (CERP)). The 11th PAR used the CPES garrison infrastructure at Cercottes in the vicinity of Orléans – Bricy Air Base.
Maritime Operations Parachutist Training Center (Centre parachutiste d'entraînement aux opérations maritimes (CPEOM), Quélern - combat diver unit under DGSE's Action Division, established in 1985 through the reorganisation of the Combat Divers Training Center (Centre d'instruction de nageurs de combat (CINC)) at the Aspretto Naval Air Base in Ajaccio, Corsica after the Rainbow Warrior case. Unlike the CINC, which was part of the 11th Parachute Assault Regiment's predecessor, the CPEOM came directly under the Action Division.

Foreign Legion 
 1 Régiment Etranger (1 RE) administrative unit of the Foreign Legion Headquarters in Aubagne

See also 
Structure of the French Army for the current structure of the French Army
NATO Northern Army Group wartime structure in 1989. NORTHAG would have been reinforced by the French III Corps and the Force d'Action Rapide in the event of hostilities 
NATO Central Army Group wartime structure in 1989. CENTAG would have been reinforced by the French I Corps and II Corps in the event of hostilities

References

20th-century military history of France
Army units and formations of France
Structures of military commands and formations in 1989
Wikipedia outlines